tRNA (cytidine34-2'-O)-methyltransferase (yibK (gene), methyltransferase yibK, TrmL, tRNA methyltransferase L, tRNA (cytidine34/5-carboxymethylaminomethyluridine34-2'-O)-methyltransferase) is an enzyme with systematic name S-adenosyl-L-methionine:tRNA (cytidine34/5-carboxymethylaminomethyluridine34-2'-O)-methyltransferase. This enzyme catalyses the following chemical reaction

 (1) S-adenosyl-L-methionine + cytidine34 in tRNA  S-adenosyl-L-homocysteine + 2'-O-methylcytidine34 in tRNA
 (2) S-adenosyl-L-methionine + 5-carboxymethylaminomethyluridine34 in tRNALeu  S-adenosyl-L-homocysteine + 5-carboxymethylaminomethyl-2'-O-methyluridine34 in tRNALeu

The enzyme from Escherichia coli catalyses the 2'-O-methylation of cytidine or 5-carboxymethylaminomethyluridine at the wobble position at nucleotide 34 in tRNALeuCmAA and tRNALeucmnm5UmAA.

References

External links 
 

EC 2.1.1